| tries = {{#expr:
 + 1 + 9 + 12 + 11 +  7 + 10 + 14 +  9 +  7 +  7
 + 5 + 5 +  7 + 13 + 14 +  9 + 14 +  2 +  2 + 11
 + 3 + 3 +  4 +  5 +  8 + 11 +  5 +  6 +  1 +  3
 + 3 + 4 +  3 +  5 +  5 +  7 +  6 +  3 +  1 +  8
 + 4 + 4 +  3 +  9 +  2 +  6 + 14 + 12 + 10 +  0
 + 3 + 9 +  3 +  8 +  7 + 10 +  6 +  3 + 12 +  8
 + 8 + 9 + 4 + 7
 + 3 + 6
 + 5
}}
| top point scorer = Freddie Burns (Gloucester)(86 points)
| top try scorer = Horacio Agulla (Bath)Francis Fainifo (Stade Français)Adrien Planté (Perpignan)Andy Short (Worcester)(6 tries)
| venue = RDS Arena
| attendance2 = 20,396
| champions =  Leinster
| count = 1
| runner-up =  Stade Français
| website = http://www.ercrugby.com/eng/
| previous year = 2011–12
| previous tournament = 2011–12 European Challenge Cup
| next year = 2013–14
| next tournament = 2013–14 European Challenge Cup
}}

The 2012–13 Amlin Challenge Cup was the 17th season of the European Challenge Cup, Europe's second-tier club rugby union competition. A total of 23 teams participated — 20 in the pool stage, plus three teams parachuting into the knockout stages from the Heineken Cup. The original 20 teams represented six countries.

The pool stage began in Mont-de-Marsan on 11 October 2012, with Stade Montois hosting Gloucester. It ended on 19 January 2013 when Stade Français hosted competition newcomers London Welsh, followed by the knockout stages culminating in the final at the RDS Arena in Dublin on 17 May 2013.

The defending Challenge Cup champions, France's Biarritz Olympique, did not initially have a chance to defend their crown because they earned an automatic berth in the Heineken Cup.  However, having finish 2nd in their pool, and failing to reach the knockout stages of the Heineken Cup, they were one of three teams parachuted into the Challenge Cup knockout stages. They were knocked out of the competition by Leinster at the semi-final stage. Leinster went on to win the competition, defeating Stade Français 34–13 in the final.

Teams

Gernika Rugby Taldea represented Spain despite finishing just 5th in the División de Honor. Valladolid won the División de Honor, and the championship playoff, but turned down the opportunity to play in the Challenge Cup due to economic factors. As runners up in the championship playoff, Gernika qualified in their place.

Seeding
Teams that did not qualify for the 2012–13 Heineken Cup were ordered into four tiers according to the European Rugby Club Ranking. Five pools of four teams were drawn comprising one team from each tier.

The brackets show each team's European Rugby Club Ranking at the end of the 2011–12 season.

Pool stage

{| class="wikitable"
|+ Key to colours
|-
| style="background:#cfc;"|    
|Winner of each pool advances to quarterfinals.Seed # in parentheses.
|}

Points breakdown:
4 points for a win
2 points for a draw
1 bonus point for scoring four or more tries in a match (TB)
1 bonus point for a loss by seven points or less (LB)
Source: www.ercrugby.com

Pool 1

Pool 2

Per the Competition Rules, Perpignan and Worcester were level on the first tiebreaker of head-to-head competition points (5–5); Perpignan topped the pool on the second tiebreaker of head-to-head try count (3–1).

Pool 3

Pool 4

Pool 5

 The result of the Grenoble / London Welsh match on 7 December 2012 was 20–9 to Grenoble, but London Welsh were retroactively awarded a 28–0 victory and five match points, after Grenoble admitted fielding an ineligible player, Lotu Taukeiaho, during the match.

Seeding for knockout stage
Following the end of the pool stage, the 5 pool winners were seeded alongside the 3 2012–13 Heineken Cup pool runners-up who failed to qualify for the Heineken Cup quarter-finals – designated (HC).  Teams are ranked by total number of Competition Points earned (4 for a win, 2 for a draw, etc.) in the pool stages.  If this does not separate the teams, qualification/ranking will be based on:
(a) the number of tries scored in all Pool matches.
(b) aggregate points difference from all Pool matches.
(c) the Club with the fewest players sent off and / or suspended in all Pool matches.
(d) toss of a coin.

Knockout stage
All kickoff times are local to the match location.

Quarter-finals

Semi-finals

Final

 Under European Rugby Cup rules, the winner of the Challenge Cup was automatically entered into the following season's Heineken Cup. If the Challenge Cup winner had already domestically qualified, the Cup winner's berth passed to another team from its country. As Leinster qualified for the 2013–14 Heineken Cup through their performance in the Pro 12, Connacht qualified for the Heineken Cup.

See also

 2012–13 Heineken Cup

References

 
2012–13 rugby union tournaments for clubs
2012–13 in European rugby union
2012–13 in Irish rugby union
2012–13 in English rugby union
2012–13 in French rugby union
2012–13 in Italian rugby union
2012–13 in Romanian rugby union
2012–13 in Spanish rugby union
2012–13 in Welsh rugby union
2012